Euplectrus is a genus of hymenopteran insects of the family Eulophidae.

Euplectrus is a cosmopolitan genus and are easily distinguished from other members of the subfamily Eulophinae by three characteristics i.e. the hind tibial spurs are very long and strong with the longest spur being no less than half as long as hind tarsus and is used to anchor the female wasp to the dorsum of the host caterpillar during oviposition; the scutellum has no lateral grooves or pit-rows; and propodeum has a single strong median carina. It is a morphologically conservative genus and the species vary slightly from one another and this creates difficulties in identifying the species.

Euplectrus wasps have been found as parasitoids on the caterpillars of the families Erebidae, Euteliidae, Geometridae, Lasiocampidae, Noctuidae, Nolidae, Notodontidae, Sphingidae and Tortricidae. The larvae of all species of Euplectrus are greenish-yellow and are very obvious on the host caterpillar's cuticle to which they are very firmly attached. The parasitized caterpillars feed and remain active but stop growing and moulting.

The larvae of the wasps in the genus Euplectrus are external parasitoids of the caterpillars of various species of Lepidoptera. They are normally gregarious, laying between five and several hundred eggs per host caterpillar, although a few species lay a single egg on each host. Some species paralyse the host while others do not but in all cases the female injects the host with venom prior to oviposition. The venom stops the host from going through ecdysis, as the wasp larvae would be shed with the moulted cuticle and eventually causing the caterpillar to die, although the wasp larvae will have fully developed and spun a cocoon by that time. The eggs are positioned under the host's cuticle but above the hypodermis each egg has a pedicel with an anchor at its end which fastens the egg to the host. The eggs are normally laid on the back of the caterpillar and the larvae stay at the laying site until they complete their development sucking on the caterpillar's haemolymph. When they have completed their growth they migrate to the underside of the caterpillar and spin a loose cocoon in which they pupate, in some species the larvae spin communal cocoons around the dying host. The ability of Euplectrus larvae to spin cocoons is unique among the Eulophidae and the silk which forms the cocoon is produced in modified malpighian tubules and is exuded from the anal opening. The larva undergoes 3–5 molts before pupation and the development from oviposition to imago is normally no longer than two weeks.

References

Key to Nearctic eulophid genera 
Universal Chalcidoidea Database 

Eulophidae